The London Sevens is played annually as part of the IRB Sevens World Series for international rugby sevens (seven-a-side version of rugby union). The 2009 competition took place on May 23 and May 24 in London, England, and was the seventh Cup trophy in the 2008-09 IRB Sevens World Series. England won the most prestigious Cup trophy, with an extra time 31-26 victory over New Zealand; Fiji won the Plate trophy, Kenya won the Bowl trophy, and Canada won the Shield trophy.

Format

The tournament consists of four round-robin pools of four teams. All sixteen teams progress to the knockout stage. The top two teams from each group progress to quarter-finals in the main competition, with the winners of those quarter-finals competing in cup semi-finals and the losers competing in plate semi-finals. The bottom two teams from each group progress to quarter-finals in the consolation competition, with the winners of those quarter-finals competing in bowl semi-finals and the losers competing in shield semi-finals.

Teams

Pool stages

Pool A
{| class="wikitable" style="text-align: center;"
|-
!width="200"|Team
!width="40"|Pld
!width="40"|W
!width="40"|D
!width="40"|L
!width="40"|PF
!width="40"|PA
!width="40"|+/-
!width="40"|Pts
|- 
|align=left| 
|3||3||0||0||116||19||+97||9
|-
|align=left| 
|3||2||0||1||95||38||+57||7
|- 
|align=left| 
|3||1||0||2||71||65||+6||5
|- 
|align=left| 
|3||0||0||3||5||165||-160||3
|}

Pool B
{| class="wikitable" style="text-align: center;"
|-
!width="200"|Team
!width="40"|Pld
!width="40"|W
!width="40"|D
!width="40"|L
!width="40"|PF
!width="40"|PA
!width="40"|+/-
!width="40"|Pts
|- 
|align=left| 
|3||3||0||0||112||28||+84||9
|- 
|align=left| 
|3||1||1||1||97||53||+44||6
|- 
|align=left| 
|3||1||1||1||87||57||+30||6
|-
|align=left| 
|3||0||0||3||7||165||-158||2
|}

Pool C
{| class="wikitable" style="text-align: center;"
|-
!width="200"|Team
!width="40"|Pld
!width="40"|W
!width="40"|D
!width="40"|L
!width="40"|PF
!width="40"|PA
!width="40"|+/-
!width="40"|Pts
|- 
|align=left| 
|3||2||0||1||64||24||+40||7
|- 
|align=left| 
|3||2||0||1||59||27||+32||7
|- 
|align=left| 
|3||2||0||1||55||38||+17||7
|- 
|align=left| 
|3||0||0||3||10||99||-89||3
|}

Pool D
{| class="wikitable" style="text-align: center;"
|-
!width="200"|Team
!width="40"|Pld
!width="40"|W
!width="40"|D
!width="40"|L
!width="40"|PF
!width="40"|PA
!width="40"|+/-
!width="40"|Pts
|- 
|align=left| 
|3||3||0||0||121||7||+114||9
|- 
|align=left| 
|3||1||1||1||52||71||-19||6
|- 
|align=left| 
|3||1||1||1||45||71||-26||6
|- 
|align=left| 
|3||0||0||3||19||88||-79||3
|}

Knockout

Shield

Bowl

Plate

Cup

External links
 London Sevens Profile on UR7s.com
 IRB Sevens
 London Sevens on irb.com

London
London Sevens
London Sevens
London Sevens
London Sevens